Sacred Kingdom (Chinese: 蓮華生輝), (foaled 18 November 2003 in Australia on Kornong Stud) is a Thoroughbred racehorse trained in Hong Kong. His group one success came in the Hong Kong Sprint. His retirement was announced in April 2012.

In Australia he was known as Jumbo Star.

References 

The Hong Kong Jockey Club - Sacred Kingdom Racing record 
The Hong Kong Jockey Club
Sacred Kingdom Pedigree

2003 racehorse births
Racehorses bred in Australia
Racehorses trained in Australia
Racehorses trained in Hong Kong
Thoroughbred family 22-b